Richard John Spencer (born in London, England 3 June 1965) is a British journalist. He is the middle east editor for The Times and previously in the same post at The Daily Telegraph.

Background

Spencer was educated at Sherborne School and Lincoln College, Oxford. He has previously worked for six years as the newspaper's Beijing correspondent before moving to Dubai, United Arab Emirates to take up his new post as one of their Middle East correspondents. Spencer moved to Cairo, Egypt in the wake of the Arab Spring for ease of coverage.

A former blogger for The Daily Telegraph, he is known for his witty anecdotes and dry sense of humour. Spencer was the first Western journalist to reach Yingxiu after the 2008 Sichuan earthquake where 80% of the town had been destroyed.

Spencer left The Telegraph in August 2016. He joined The Times newspaper in 2016 and is based in Beirut, Lebanon. He was nominated as Foreign Reporter of the Year
in the National Press Awards for 2018.

Spencer is married to writer and poet, Dr Helen Wing; the couple have three children together.

References

External links
 Richard Spencer's blog
 Richard Spencer

1965 births
Living people
British journalists
The Daily Telegraph people